Pebble Hill, also known as the Scott-Yarbrough House, is an antebellum cottage in Auburn, Alabama listed on the National Register of Historic Places.  It currently serves as the location of the Caroline Marshall Draughon Center for the Arts & Humanities in the College of Liberal Arts at Auburn University.

History
Colonel Nathaniel J. Scott built Pebble Hill in 1847 at the center of a  plantation.  The structure was built in the Greek Revival style with hand-hewn heart of pine floors and joists and rafters held together by wooden pegs.  During the Civil War, Wilson's Raiders looted the home, but were unable to find many of the valuables, which had been buried near a spring on the property.  By the end of the Civil War, Scott was forced to sell the home, which saw a number of different owners over the following decades.  In 1912, the home was purchased by Cecil S. Yarbrough, a state representative and three-time mayor of Auburn.  The home remained in the Yarbrough family until 1974, when it was purchased and restored by the Auburn Heritage Association. It was placed on the National Register of Historic Places on May 16, 1975. In 1985 the property was donated to Auburn University, which located its Center for the Arts & Humanities in the structure.

See also
National Register of Historic Places listings in Lee County, Alabama

References

Historic Chattahoochee Commission and the Lee County Historical Society (1978). Scott-Yarbrough House. Historic Marker. Located at 101 Debardeleben Street, Auburn, Ala. 
Logue, Mickey & Simms, Jack (1996). Auburn: A Pictorial History of the Loveliest Village, Revised. Auburn, Ala.

External links

Caroline Marshall Draughon Center for the Arts & Humanities

Historical Marker about the Scott-Yarborough House

Auburn University
National Register of Historic Places in Lee County, Alabama
Houses completed in 1847
Buildings and structures in Auburn, Alabama
Alabama in the American Civil War
Houses on the National Register of Historic Places in Alabama
Houses in Lee County, Alabama
Historic American Buildings Survey in Alabama
1847 establishments in Alabama